Gregory A. Feest (born 1956) is a retired United States Air Force (USAF) major general who last served as the Chief of Safety of the United States Air Force, Headquarters USAF, Washington, D.C., and commander of the Air Force Safety Center, Kirtland Air Force Base, New Mexico.

Early life and education
Feest was born in 1956 in Racine, Wisconsin. He attended St. Catherine's High School graduating in 1974. He received his USAF commission through the ROTC program at the University of Wisconsin in 1978.

Career
Feest has held a variety of flying assignments, including command of the operations and maintenance of one of only two operational F-117A Nighthawk stealth fighter squadrons. He has also commanded the 479th Flying Training Group, Moody Air Force Base, Georgia; the 379th Air Expeditionary Wing, Southwest Asia; and 19th Air Force, Randolph AFB, Texas. His staff assignments include USAF liaison officer to the U.S. Senate, senior military assistant to the director of operational test and evaluation in the Office of the Secretary of Defense, and deputy director of requirements at Headquarters Air Combat Command, Langley AFB, Virginia. The general also served as Air Education and Training Command's director of logistics, installations and mission support, as well as deputy director for force application in the Directorate of Force Structure, Resources and Assessment on the Joint Staff. He retired on 1 November 2012. He since has worked at L3 Technologies as vice president of USAF Programs and at Lockheed Martin's Advanced Development Programs (Skunk Works) as deputy director of operations, business, and strategy development and is the executive director for the National Commission on Military Aviation Safety.

He is also recognized for having dropped the first bomb of Operation Desert Storm, flying the F-117A.

Assignments
 October 1978 – December 1979, student, undergraduate navigator training, Mather Air Force Base, California
 January 1980 – December 1982, F-111E weapons and tactics officer, 20th Tactical Fighter Wing, RAF Upper Heyford, England
 January 1983 – October 1984, student, undergraduate pilot training, Reese AFB, Texas, and student, F-15C Replacement Training Unit, Luke AFB, Arizona
 October 1984 – December 1987, F-15C flight commander, instructor pilot and flight examiner, 27th Tactical Fighter Squadron, Langley AFB, Virginia
 January 1988 – July 1991, F-117A assistant operations officer, flight commander and instructor pilot, 37th Tactical Fighter Wing, Tonopah Test Range, Nevada
 August 1991 – June 1992, student, Air Command and Staff College, Maxwell AFB, Alabama
 June 1992 – June 1994, deputy chief of Senate liaison, Secretary of the Air Force Legislative Liaison, Washington, D.C.
 June 1994 – May 1995, operations officer, 7th Fighter Squadron, Holloman AFB, New Mexico
 May 1995 – June 1997, commander of 9th Fighter Squadron, Holloman AFB, New Mexico
 July 1997 – June 1998, student, National War College, Fort Lesley J. McNair, Washington, D.C.
 June 1998 – June 2000, senior military assistant to the director of operational test and evaluation, Office of the Secretary of Defense, Washington, D.C.
 July 2000 – January 2002, commander, 479th Flying Training Group, Moody AFB, Georgia
 February 2002 – July 2004, deputy director of requirements, Headquarters Air Combat Command, Langley AFB, Virginia
 July 2004 – June 2005, commander of 379th Air Expeditionary Wing, Southwest Asia
 July 2005 – July 2006, deputy director of intelligence and air, space and information operations for flying training, Air Education and Training Command (AETC), Randolph AFB, Texas
 July 2006 – December 2006, director of logistics, installations and mission support, Headquarters AETC, Randolph AFB, Texas
 December 2006 – July 2008, deputy director for force application, Directorate of Force Structure, Resources and Assessment, Joint Staff, the Pentagon, Washington, D.C.
 July 2008 – August 2010, commander of 19th Air Force, Randolph AFB, Texas
 August 2010 – November 2012, Air Force Chief of Safety, Headquarters USAF, Washington, D.C., and Commander, Air Force Safety Center, Kirtland AFB, New Mexico

Education
1978 Bachelor of Business Administration degree in management and finance, University of Wisconsin-Madison
1984 Squadron Officer School, Maxwell Air Force Base, Alabama
1985 MBA in management, Golden Gate University, San Francisco, California
1992 Air Command and Staff College, Maxwell Air Force Base, Alabama
1998 Master of Science in national security strategy,  National War College, Fort Lesley J. McNair, Washington, D.C.
2003 National Security Management Course, Syracuse University, N.Y.
2006 Combined Force Air Component Commander Course, Maxwell Air Force Base, Alabama
2010 Joint Flag Officer Warfighting Course, Maxwell Air Force Base, Alabama

Flight information
Rating: Command pilot
Flight hours: 5,500 hours, including more than 800 combat hours earned during operations Just Cause, Desert Storm, Iraqi Freedom and Enduring Freedom.
Aircraft flown: F-111E, AT-38B, T-38C, T-38A, T-6A, A-7D, F-15C, F-15E and F-117A

Awards and decorations

Effective dates of promotion

References

1956 births
Living people
United States Air Force generals
Recipients of the Legion of Merit
Recipients of the Distinguished Flying Cross (United States)
Recipients of the Air Medal
United States Air Force personnel of the War in Afghanistan (2001–2021)
United States Air Force personnel of the Gulf War
United States Air Force personnel of the Iraq War
University of Wisconsin–Madison alumni
Golden Gate University alumni
Syracuse University alumni
National War College alumni
Recipients of the Defense Superior Service Medal